Agony in the Garden is a 1590 oil on canvas painting by El Greco or his studio, dating to his second stay in Toledo and still showing the major influence of Titian on his work. It is now on display in the Toledo Art Museum in Toledo, Ohio.

An angel appears to Christ in the left foreground, holding a chalice in his hand. In the right-hand background, Judas and a group of soldiers approach to arrest Christ, marching through a dry landscape without vegetation.

Bibliography 
  ÁLVAREZ LOPERA, José, El Greco, Madrid, Arlanza, 2005, Biblioteca «Descubrir el Arte», (colección «Grandes maestros»). .
  SCHOLZ-HÄNSEL, Michael, El Greco, Colonia, Taschen, 2003. .

External links 
  

Paintings by El Greco
Paintings in the collection of the Toledo Museum of Art
1590 paintings
Angels in art
El Greco
Paintings depicting Judas Iscariot